Rui Miguel Batista Araújo, known as Mozer (born 15 March 1972) is a Portuguese football coach and a former player.

He played 9 seasons and 194 games in the Primeira Liga for Braga, Rio Ave and Farense.

Club career
He made his Primeira Liga debut for Braga on 25 August 1996 as a starter in a 1–1 draw against Benfica.

References

1972 births
Footballers from Porto
Living people
Portuguese footballers
F.C. Pedras Rubras players
Leixões S.C. players
S.C. Braga players
Primeira Liga players
S.C. Farense players
Rio Ave F.C. players
Liga Portugal 2 players
C.D. Trofense players
UD Vecindario players
Portuguese expatriate footballers
Expatriate footballers in Spain
Portuguese expatriate sportspeople in Spain
C.D. Santa Clara players
S.C. Covilhã players
Rebordosa A.C. players
Association football midfielders
Portuguese football managers
CD Candal managers
A.D. Nogueirense managers